A  is a dessert cake made with layers of almond and hazelnut meringue and whipped cream or buttercream on a buttery biscuit base.

The term  can also refer to the nut meringue layer itself.

Etymology
It takes its name from the feminine form of the French word , meaning 'of Dax', a town in southwestern France. It is usually served chilled and accompanied by fruit.

Variants

See also
 Kyiv cake
 List of almond dishes

References

External links 

French cakes
Layer cakes
Almond desserts
Meringue desserts